The discography of Limp Bizkit, an American nu metal band, consists of six studio albums, three compilation albums, one remix album, one live album, one extended play, 26 singles, three promotional singles, 28 music videos and two video albums. Limp Bizkit formed in 1994 in Jacksonville, Florida. The band has sold an estimated 40 million albums worldwide.

Albums

Studio albums

Live albums

Compilation albums

Remix albums

Video albums

Extended play

Singles

As lead artist

As featured artist

Promotional singles

Music videos

Notes

 A  For its original 1997 release in the United States, "Counterfeit" was released as a double A-side single with "Nobody Loves Me". "Counterfeit" was re-released twice; in late 1997, and once more on September 28, 1999, under the revised title "Counterfeit Countdown".
 B   "N 2 Gether Now" and "Break Stuff" charted together as a double A-side single in the Netherlands and Switzerland.
 C  "Break Stuff" did not enter the Billboard Hot 100, but peaked at number 23 on the Bubbling Under Hot 100 Singles chart, which acts as an extension to the Hot 100.
 D  "Take a Look Around" did not enter the Billboard Hot 100, but peaked at number 15 on the Bubbling Under Hot 100 Singles chart, which acts as an extension to the Hot 100.
 E  "Rollin" was released as a double A-side single with "Getcha Groove On".
 F  "Dad Vibes" did not enter the Billboard Alternative Airplay chart, but peaked at number 50 on the Hot Rock & Alternative Songs chart.
 G  "Dad Vibes" did not enter the Billboard Mainstream Rock chart, but peaked at number 6 on the Hot Hard Rock Songs chart.

References

Heavy metal group discographies
Discographies of American artists
Discography